Wechterswinkel Abbey was a Cistercian nunnery in the small village of Wechterswinkel, a part of Bastheim in the mountainous region of the Rhön in Bavaria, Germany, in the Bishopric of Würzburg.

History
The abbey, dedicated to the Holy Trinity and Saint Margaret, was founded in 1134 or 1135 by Embricho of Leiningen, bishop of Würzburg, and King Conrad III of Germany. It was so severely damaged in the wars of the early 16th century that it was unable to continue, and was dissolved in 1592 by Julius Echter von Mespelbrunn, the then bishop of Würzburg. The assets realised were invested to endow parish benefices and schools.

Buildings
The church, a Romanesque basilica heavily altered in the early 19th century, has survived as the village parish church, now dedicated to Saints Cosmas and Damian.

Some of the monastic buildings also survive, put to secular uses, but have been comprehensively altered and retain no medieval character.

References

External links
 Pictures of Wechterswinkel
 Rhön Lexikon: Wechterswinkel

Cistercian nunneries in Germany
Monasteries in Bavaria
Rhön-Grabfeld